Temple Sinai is a Reform Jewish Synagogue located in Houston, Texas. It primarily serves Jewish residents on the west side of the city as well as a number of western suburbs, including Katy, Cinco Ranch and Sugar Land. The congregation is composed of more than 200 families and is led by Rabbi David Lipper who was hired in 2022. The synagogue is a member of the Union for Reform Judaism (URJ) and its youth group is associated with the North American Federation of Temple Youth (NFTY).

History
The congregation was founded in 1979 by nine families seeking to establish a Reform Jewish presence in western Harris County. Its first Rabbi, Abraham Shaw served in a part-time capacity until 1984, when he was succeeded by Rabbi Howard Rabinowitz. The congregation experienced significant growth in the 1990s, resulting in the hiring of its first full-time rabbi, Todd Thalblum, in 1999. Land was purchased in 2000, and the construction of a new building began in 2002 and completed in 2003. Rabbi Thalblum served until 2008 and was succeeded by Rabbi Barry Diamond on an interim basis until a new rabbi was selected. In 2009, Temple Sinai hired Rabbi Annie Belford who was one of the first women to serve as a solo rabbi for a Houston congregation.

References

External links
Temple Sinai website

Reform synagogues in Texas
Jewish organizations established in 1979
Buildings and structures in Houston
Synagogues completed in 2003
1979 establishments in Texas